Jair Bolsonaro presidential campaign could refer to 
Jair Bolsonaro 2018 presidential campaign
Jair Bolsonaro 2022 presidential campaign